Holland House, formerly called Julian Hodge House, is a high-rise hotel on Newport Road near the centre of Cardiff, Wales. Originally an office block, the  building has 15 floors and is the tenth tallest building in Cardiff.

History

The building
The building was constructed in 1968 by the Welsh financier Julian Hodge (1904 –2004) and was named Julian Hodge House. It was later called the Julian S. Hodge Building.

The building was refurbished in 2003/4 for hotel use.
It underwent an alteration and refurbishment project on the existing concrete framed structure, including the destruction of an existing two-storey extension structure.

Occupants
The building was built as an office block, its occupants included Lloyds TSB Bank.

In 2004 it became the Macdonald Holland House Hotel. The hotel was run by Macdonald Hotels until 2007 when it was sold to AccorHotels to operate under the Mercure brand.

In 2006, the exterior of the building was used as a hospital for the BBC television sci-fi drama series Torchwood, which was produced in Cardiff.

Hotel facilities
Mercure Holland House and Spa is a 4-star hotel with 165 rooms. The hotel has a first floor restaurant and a lounge bar, an indoor swimming pool and seventeen meeting spaces.

See also
List of tallest buildings in Cardiff

Notes

Landmarks in Cardiff
Hotels in Cardiff
Towers in Wales
Skyscrapers in Wales
Adamsdown
Skyscraper hotels in the United Kingdom
Hotels established in 2004
Hotel buildings completed in 1968